Antônio de Moura Carvalho (born 29 May 1986), commonly known as Tony, is a Brazilian footballer who plays for Criciúma.

Career
Tony began to be seen in senary football from the fine performances with the shirt Ituano, and thus arrive at Botafogo but not before going into some clubs. Botafogo after he went to the town that lent two consecutive years to reach the Ceará, which has a contract until the middle of 2011.

Statistics

References

External links
 

1986 births
Living people
Footballers from São Paulo
Brazilian footballers
Association football midfielders
Association football forwards
Campeonato Brasileiro Série A players
Campeonato Brasileiro Série B players
Ituano FC players
Boavista Sport Club players
Botafogo de Futebol e Regatas players
Duque de Caxias Futebol Clube players
Ceará Sporting Club players
Associação Atlética Ponte Preta players
ABC Futebol Clube players
Esporte Clube XV de Novembro (Piracicaba) players
América Futebol Clube (MG) players
Esteghlal F.C. players
Brazilian expatriate footballers
Brazilian expatriate sportspeople in Iran
Expatriate footballers in Iran